Bundock is an abandoned rural town in the Shire of Richmond, Queensland, Australia. The town is within the locality of Maxwelton.

Geography
The town is just south of O'Connell Creek. Bundock was (and still is) at the midpoint of a stock route between the towns of Maxwelton and Richmond.

There are 10 half-acre town lots, but there are no buildings nor signs of any development.

History
The town was surveyed by Frank A. Gorringe on 14 December 1899 and gazetted as a town on 10 February 1900.

Bundock is named after horse breeder Wellington Cochrane Bundock (1812-1898).  In 1863, Bundock formed a partnership with Walter Hayes to graze cattle on the Richmond Downs pastoral run (the origin of the town of Richmond).

References 

Shire of Richmond
Towns in Queensland